Mycolicibacter hiberniae (formerly Mycobacterium hiberniae) is a species of bacteria in the phylum Actinomycetota.

Etymology Hibernia, Latin for Ireland where it was first isolated.

Description
Polymorphic, beaded, gram-positive, nonmotile and acid-fast rods (0.9 µm × 1.2–1.5 µm).

Colony characteristics
Smooth and glistening colonies with rose-pink pigmentation but become rough and dry later. Colonies with unique pigment production are 1-1.5 mm in diameter.

Physiology
Slow growth on Löwenstein-Jensen medium and Middlebrook 7H10 agar at 37 °C (range: 22-37 °C). No growth at 42 °C.
Resistant to isoniazid, rifampin, and streptomycin
Sensitive to ethambutol.

Differential characteristics
M. hiberniae has unusual rose-pink pigmentation, which is unique in the genus Mycobacterium.

Pathogenesis
Not pathogenic
Provokes a nonspecific skin hypersensitivity reaction to bovine tuberculin.
Biosafety level 1

Type strain
First isolated from true moss, sphagnum, and soil in Ireland

References

External links
Type strain of M. hiberniae at BacDive -  the Bacterial Diversity Metadatabase

Acid-fast bacilli
hiberniae
Bacteria described in 1993